Barnaby Ralph (born 14 October 1969) is a professional virtuoso recorder player. He studied with a number of teachers, including Rosalind Kelly and John Martin in Australia and Hans Maria Kneihs in Vienna. In 2000, he was awarded the Postgraduate Association Medal of Excellence as the top Masters graduate from the Queensland Conservatorium of Music. Ralph has appeared worldwide on the concert stage as a soloist in chamber recitals, in orchestras, as well as on radio and television. His ongoing partnership with the Belgian harpsichordist Huguette Brassine has produced a recording of the sonatas of Francesco Barsanti that was released internationally by Naxos Records in 2006. The recording gained favourable reviews, and excerpts were played on Australian radio.

Ralph has performed music in a wide range of styles, from medieval and baroque to post-avant garde. He has had contemporary works written for him by a number of well-known composers, including Betty Beath, Masturneh Nazarian, and Anika Mittendorf. His recording of Beath’s ‘Night Song’ appears on the disc 'American Dream' and the piece itself was dedicated to Barnaby Ralph. Ralph is also active as a lecturer, teacher, musical instrument maker, and musicologist. He is currently living and performing in Tokyo, Japan, where he is a professor in the faculty of humanities at Seikei University.

Publications
With Huguette Brassine, Barnaby Ralph edited the score of Barsanti's Complete Original Recorder Sonatas, published by Dolce.

Ralph's review of harpsichordist Elizabeth Anderson's The Convict Harpsichordist was published in the journal, Early Music.

Ralph's teaching article "Modern recorder music, techniques and classroom applications" was published in Australian journal, Bulletin (Kodaly Music Education Institute of Australia).

Recordings
2006: Francesco Barsanti: The complete recorder sonatas, Op. 1. With Louise King (Violoncello) and Huguette Brassine (Harpsichord). Naxos (8.557944).
July 2003: ‘Discord on the Danube’. Blue Minor Records, Vienna.
Jan 2001: ‘American Dream’. Jade Records (JADCD-1090). 
Dec 2000: ‘Sonic Textures’. Chailight (cpcd01).

References

External links
 The Brisbane Institute
 Researchmap.jp

1969 births
Living people
Australian recorder players
Queensland Conservatorium Griffith University alumni